|}

The Flame Of Tara Stakes is a Group 3 flat horse race in Ireland open to two-year-old thoroughbred fillies. It is run at the Curragh over a distance of 1 mile (1,609 metres), and it is scheduled to take place each year in late August or early September.

The race was first run in 2003 and was awarded Group 3 status in 2016.

The race is named in tribute to the Irish broodmare, Flame of Tara, who was dam of 11 winners including Salsabil and Marju.  
From 1997 to 2002, the name of Flame of Tara was used in conjunction with the Tyros Stakes.

Records
Leading jockey since 2003 (5 wins):
 Fran Berry - Forthefirstime (2007), Dreamtheimpossible (2008), Corcovada (2009), Chrysanthemum (2010), Jack Naylor (2014) 

Leading trainer since 2003 (3 wins):
 Jessica Harrington - Jack Naylor (2014), Cayenne Pepper (2019), Magical Lagoon (2021)
 Aidan O'Brien - Kind Of Magic (2015), Just Wonderful (2018), Divinely (2020)

Winners

See also
 Horse racing in Ireland
 List of Irish flat horse races

References

Racing Post:

horseracingintfed.com – International Federation of Horseracing Authorities – Flame Of Tara Stakes (2018).

Flat races in Ireland
Curragh Racecourse
Flat horse races for two-year-old fillies
Recurring sporting events established in 2003
2003 establishments in Ireland